DeKalb is an unincorporated community in Kershaw County, South Carolina, United States. Its ZIP code is 29175. It is located on US Route 521, 9 miles north of Camden. The community is named for Baron DeKalb.

Notes

Unincorporated communities in Kershaw County, South Carolina
Unincorporated communities in South Carolina